Prednisone is a glucocorticoid medication mostly used to suppress the immune system and decrease inflammation in conditions such as asthma, COPD, and rheumatologic diseases. It is also used to treat high blood calcium due to cancer and adrenal insufficiency along with other steroids. It is taken by mouth.

Common side effects with long-term use include cataracts, bone loss, easy bruising, muscle weakness, and thrush. Other side effects include weight gain, swelling, high blood sugar, increased risk of infection, and psychosis. It is generally considered safe in pregnancy and low doses appear to be safe when breastfeeding. After prolonged use, prednisone needs to be stopped gradually.

Prednisone is a prodrug and must be converted to prednisolone by the liver before it becomes active. Prednisolone then binds to glucocorticoid receptors, activating them and triggering changes in gene expression.

Prednisone was patented in 1954 and approved for medical use in the United States in 1955. It is on the World Health Organization's List of Essential Medicines. It is available as a generic medication. In 2020, it was the 30th most commonly prescribed medication in the United States, with more than 19million prescriptions.

Medical uses 
Prednisone is used for many different autoimmune diseases and inflammatory conditions, including asthma, gout, COPD, CIDP, rheumatic disorders, allergic disorders, ulcerative colitis and Crohn's disease, granulomatosis with polyangiitis, adrenocortical insufficiency, hypercalcemia due to cancer, thyroiditis, laryngitis, severe tuberculosis, hives, eczema, lipid pneumonitis, pericarditis, multiple sclerosis, nephrotic syndrome, sarcoidosis, to relieve the effects of shingles, lupus, myasthenia gravis, poison oak exposure, Ménière's disease,  autoimmune hepatitis, giant-cell arteritis, the Herxheimer reaction that is common during the treatment of syphilis, Duchenne muscular dystrophy, uveitis, and as part of a drug regimen to prevent rejection after organ transplant.

Prednisone has also been used in the treatment of migraine headaches and cluster headaches and for severe aphthous ulcer. Prednisone is used as an antitumor drug. It is important in the treatment of acute lymphoblastic leukemia, non-Hodgkin lymphomas, Hodgkin's lymphoma, multiple myeloma, and other hormone-sensitive tumors, in combination with other anticancer drugs.

Prednisone is often also prescribed as a form of treatment for Sudden Sensorineural Hearing Loss (SSNHL).

Prednisone can be used in the treatment of decompensated heart failure to increase renal responsiveness to diuretics, especially in heart failure patients with refractory diuretic resistance with large doses of loop diuretics. In terms of the mechanism of action for this purpose: prednisone, a glucocorticoid, can improve renal responsiveness to atrial natriuretic peptide by increasing the density of natriuretic peptide receptor type A in the renal inner medullary collecting duct, thereby inducing a potent diuresis.

At high doses it may be used to prevent rejection following organ transplant.

Side effects 

Short-term side effects, as with all glucocorticoids, include high blood glucose levels (especially in patients with diabetes mellitus or on other medications that increase blood glucose, such as tacrolimus) and mineralocorticoid effects such as fluid retention. The mineralocorticoid effects of prednisone are minor, which is why it is not used in the management of adrenal insufficiency, unless a more potent mineralocorticoid is administered concomitantly.

It can also cause depression or depressive symptoms and anxiety in some individuals.

Long-term side effects include Cushing's syndrome, steroid dementia syndrome, truncal weight gain, glaucoma and cataracts, diabetes mellitus type 2, and depression upon dose reduction or cessation. Long-term steroids can also increase the risk of osteoporosis, but research has found that few of these people were taking medications to protect bones. Prednisone also results in leukocytosis.

When used as treatment for sudden deafness or sudden sensorineural hearing loss, it can cause or exacerbate tinnitus or a ringing in the ears.

Major 
Source:

 Steroid myopathy
 Increased blood sugar for individuals with diabetes 
 Difficulty in regulating emotion
 Difficulty in maintaining linear thinking
 Weight gain due to increased appetite
 Immunosuppression
 Corticosteroid-induced lipodystrophy (moon face, central obesity)
 Depression, mania, psychosis, or other psychiatric symptoms
 Unusual fatigue or weakness
 Mental confusion
 Memory and attention dysfunction (steroid dementia syndrome)
 Muscle atrophy
 Blurred vision
 Abdominal pain
 Peptic ulcer
 Painful hips or  shoulders
 Steroid-induced osteoporosis
 Stretch marks
 Osteonecrosis – same as avascular necrosis
 Insomnia
 Severe joint pain
 Cataracts or glaucoma
 Anxiety
 Black stool
 Stomach pain or bloating
 Severe swelling
 Mouth sores or dry mouth
 Avascular necrosis
 Hepatic steatosis

Minor 
Source:

 Nervousness
 Acne
 Skin rash
 Appetite gain
 Hyperactivity
 Increased thirst
 Frequent urination
 Diarrhea
 Reduced intestinal flora
 Leg pain/cramps
 Sensitive teeth
 Headache
 Induced vomiting

Dependency 
Adrenal suppression will begin to occur if prednisone is taken for longer than seven days. Eventually, this may cause the body to temporarily lose the ability to manufacture natural corticosteroids (especially cortisol), which results in dependence on prednisone. For this reason, prednisone should not be abruptly stopped if taken for more than seven days; instead, the dosage should be gradually reduced. This weaning process may be over a few days if the course of prednisone was short, but may take weeks or months if the patient had been on long-term treatment. Abrupt withdrawal may lead to an Addisonian crisis. For those on chronic therapy, alternate-day dosing may preserve adrenal function and thereby reduce side effects.

Glucocorticoids act to inhibit feedback of both the hypothalamus, decreasing corticotropin-releasing hormone (CRH), and corticotrophs in the anterior pituitary gland, decreasing the amount of adrenocorticotropic hormone (ACTH). For this reason, glucocorticoid analogue drugs such as prednisone down-regulate the natural synthesis of glucocorticoids. This mechanism leads to dependence in a short time and can be dangerous if medications are withdrawn too quickly. The body must have time to begin synthesis of CRH and ACTH and for the adrenal glands to begin functioning normally again.

Prednisone may start to result in the suppression of the hypothalamic-pituitary-adrenal (HPA) axis if used at doses 7–10 mg or higher for several weeks. This is approximately equal to the amount of endogenous cortisol produced by the body every day. As such, the HPA axis starts to become suppressed and atrophy. If this occurs the patient should be tapered off prednisone slowly to give the adrenal gland enough time to regain its function and endogenous production of steroids. Supplemental doses, or "stress doses" may be required in those with HPA axis suppression who are experiencing a higher degree of stress (e.g., illness, surgery, trauma, etc.). Failing to do so in such situations could be life-threatening.

Withdrawal 
The magnitude and speed of dose reduction in corticosteroid withdrawal should be determined on a case-by-case basis, taking into consideration the underlying condition being treated, and individual patient factors such as the likelihood of relapse and the duration of corticosteroid treatment. Gradual withdrawal of systemic corticosteroids should be considered in those whose disease is unlikely to relapse and have:

 received more than 40 mg prednisone (or equivalent) daily for more than one week
 been given repeat doses in the evening
 received more than three weeks of treatment
 recently received repeated courses (particularly if taken for longer than three weeks)
 taken a short course within one year of stopping long-term therapy
 other possible causes of adrenal suppression

Systemic corticosteroids may be stopped abruptly in those whose disease is unlikely to relapse and who have received treatment for three weeks or less and who are not included in the patient groups described above.

During corticosteroid withdrawal, the dose may be reduced rapidly down to physiological doses (equivalent to prednisolone 7.5 mg daily) and then reduced more slowly. Assessment of the disease may be needed during withdrawal to ensure that relapse does not occur.

Pharmacology
Prednisone is a synthetic glucocorticoid used for its anti-inflammatory and immunosuppressive properties. Prednisone is a prodrug; it is metabolised in the liver by 11-β-HSD to prednisolone, the active drug. Prednisone has no substantial biological effects until converted via hepatic metabolism to prednisolone.

Pharmacokinetics
Prednisone is absorbed in the gastrointestinal tract and has a half life of 2–3 hours. it has a volume of distribution of 0.4–1 L/kg. The drug is cleared by hepatic metabolism using cytochrome P450 enzymes. Metabolites are excreted in the bile and urine.

Lodotra
"Lodotra" is the brand name of an oral formulation, which releases prednisone four hours after ingestion. It is indicated for rheumatoid arthritis with morning stiffness. Taken at 10 p.m., it releases the drug at around 2 a.m.. The plasmic peak level is reached at 4 a.m., which is considered to be the optimal time for relieving morning stiffness. The drug was approved in the European Union, in January 2009.

Industry

The pharmaceutical industry uses prednisone tablets for the calibration of dissolution testing equipment according to the United States Pharmacopeia (USP).

Chemistry
Prednisone is a synthetic pregnane corticosteroid and derivative of cortisone and is also known as δ1-cortisone or 1,2-dehydrocortisone or as 17α,21-dihydroxypregna-1,4-diene-3,11,20-trione.

History
The first isolation and structure identifications of prednisone and prednisolone were done in 1950 by Arthur Nobile. The first commercially feasible synthesis of prednisone was carried out in 1955 in the laboratories of Schering Corporation, which later became Schering-Plough Corporation, by Arthur Nobile and coworkers. They discovered that cortisone could be microbiologically oxidized to prednisone by the bacterium Corynebacterium simplex. The same process was used to prepare prednisolone from hydrocortisone.

The enhanced adrenocorticoid activity of these compounds over cortisone and hydrocortisone was demonstrated in mice.

Prednisone and prednisolone were introduced in 1955 by Schering and Upjohn, under the brand names Meticorten and Delta-Cortef, respectively. These prescription medicines are now available from a number of manufacturers as generic drugs.

References

External links 
 
 The National Center for Biotechnology Information: Prednisone
 National Inventors Hall of Fame induction of Arthur Nobile 

Antiasthmatic drugs
Appetite stimulants
CYP3A4 inducers
Glucocorticoids
Mineralocorticoids
Prodrugs
Triketones
World Health Organization essential medicines
Wikipedia medicine articles ready to translate